Hemithiris is a genus of brachiopods belonging to the family Hemithirididae.

The species of this genus are found in Europe and Northern America.

Species:

Hemithiris braunsi 
Hemithiris dibbleei 
Hemithiris parvillima 
Hemithiris peculiaris 
Hemithiris psittacea 
Hemithiris woodwardi 
Hemithyris antarctica 
Hemithyris astoriana 
Hemithyris braunsi 
Hemithyris peculiaris

References

Brachiopod genera